KS5 or KS-5 may refer to:

 Kansas's 5th congressional district (1885–1993), United States
 K-5 (Kansas highway), an American road from Leavenworth to Kansas City
 Key Stage 5, education for British students aged 16–18